The Seiling Milling Company in Seiling, Oklahoma was listed on the National Register of Historic Places in 1983.

Its original mill building was built in 1917–18.  A two-story engine room with basement was added in 1923.

It was originally located in farm and prairie land, now is located within the limits of Seiling.

References

Grinding mills in Oklahoma
National Register of Historic Places in Dewey County, Oklahoma
Commercial buildings completed in 1918